WORC-FM, 98.9 MHz, is a country radio station owned by Cumulus Media and serving most of Worcester County, Massachusetts, and northeastern Connecticut. It is affiliated with the Worcester Railers.

History
The station signed on April 8, 1994, as WXXW, though it did not formally launch its initial format, a blend of hot talk and oldies, until April 11 (in the interim, the station stunted by continuously playing Bob Seger's "Old Time Rock and Roll").  Following original owner Alan Okun's death on December 31, 1996, the station, along with AM sister station WGFP, was sold to Bengal Atlantic Communications in 1997, who in turn sold them to Chowder Broadcasting soon afterward.  Chowder switched WXXW to a classic rock format in 1998; this was followed by a call change to WORC-FM, reflecting its newly-common ownership with WORC, that September.

Montachusett Broadcasting, owner of WXLO, acquired WORC-FM in 1999; several months later, the stations were sold to Citadel Broadcasting.  Citadel subsequently acquired competing classic rock station WWFX, and as a result reverted WORC-FM to oldies, this time on a full-time basis, on May 26, 2000. Citadel merged with Cumulus Media on September 16, 2011.

On October 31, 2014, at 10:00 a.m., WORC-FM changed their format to country, branded as "Nash Icon".

In March 2020, WORC-FM was named as the flagship radio station for the inaugural season of the Worcester Red Sox in 2021.

Programming
WORC-FM used to broadcast American Top 40: The 70s with Casey Kasem on Saturday mornings and Sunday evenings. On July 7, 2017, the Worcester Railers hockey team announced that WORC-FM would broadcast its games.

Previous logo

References

External links
 

ORC-FM
Country radio stations in the United States
Mass media in Worcester County, Massachusetts
Cumulus Media radio stations
Radio stations established in 1994
1994 establishments in Massachusetts
Worcester Red Sox